Glyptogluteus is a monotypic genus of Thelyphonid whip scorpions, first described by Jon Mark Rowland in 1973. Its single species, Glyptogluteus augustus is distributed in Philippines.

References 

Arachnid genera
Monotypic arachnid genera
Uropygi